The New England Region is one of ten United States regions that currently send teams to the Little League World Series, the largest youth baseball competition in the world. The region's participation in the Little League World Series dates back to 1957, when it was known as the East Region. However, in 2001, the East Region was split into the New England Region and the Mid-Atlantic Region.

Regional headquarters are located in Bristol, Connecticut.

The New England Region consists of four New England states:

Following the 2021 LLWS, Connecticut and Rhode Island were moved to a newly created Metro Region. The latter region is one of the two new U.S. regions to be created as part of a planned expansion of the LLWS from 16 to 20 teams. This expansion was originally scheduled to occur for 2021, but was delayed to 2022 due to the COVID-19 pandemic.

Regional championship
The year's winner is indicated in green.

2001–2021

2022–present

LLWS results
As of the 2022 Little League World Series.

Results by state
As of the 2022 Little League World Series. Italics indicates the state is no longer a member of the New England Region.

References

External links
Official site
New England Region Little League Tournament Historical Results

New England
Baseball competitions in the United States
Baseball in New England
2001 establishments in the United States
Recurring sporting events established in 2001